Land of Thirst is a South African television drama written and directed by Meg Rickards, who is Cape town based. The drama was broadcast on SABC2 in Jan/Feb 2008 in three segments and was produced by Durban-based Vuleka Productions.  It is also available as a 94-minute film which is slightly different in its opening style.

The drama was adapted from a novel published nearly a century ago, Margaret Harding, by Perceval Gibbon, who came to South Africa as a Boer War journalist and later wrote this work.

An historical romance set in the Karoo in 1913, Land of Thirst is an extraordinary love story about two people far ahead of their time, caught in the cross-currents of emergent South Africa. Margaret leaves England and moves to Africa for the treatment of her tuberculosis in the dry air of the Karoo, while Khanyiso goes there to search for his African roots. Romance flourishes for them in this “land of thirst” – but can they keep their love alive in such a hostile world?

Margaret and Khanyiso independently leave England and travel to South Africa. The consumptive Margaret seeks treatment at a sanatorium. Khanyiso is the son of a Xhosa chief executed by the British twenty years earlier who was taken to London as a child, raised as an English gentleman and given a medical training. He is returning home to unearth what happened to his father – and to serve his people as a doctor.

Margaret and Khanyiso both feel alienated in the deeply parochial society of the Karoo. The decrepit sanatorium where Margaret is being treated is run by an alcoholic doctor and his mean-spirited wife, while Khanyiso must stay in a brothel after being shunned by the racist proprietors of every guesthouse in town. Khanyiso and Margaret meet through a shy teenager named Paul – a naïve farm boy who latches onto both of them as his only friends. Khanyiso and Margaret find in each other refuge from the harsh world of the Karoo, and fall passionately in love. But their love puts both their lives at risk.

Cast
 Hlomla Dandala - Khanyiso Phalo
 Lucy Wylde - Margaret Harding
 Ian Roberts - Christiaan Di Preez
 Stephen Jennings - Doctor Jakes
 Mrs Jakes - Terri Norton
 Susan Danford - Vivie du Preez
 Pierre Malherbe - Ford

South African drama television series
SABC 2 original programming
Television shows set in South Africa